Hugh Myddleton Butler, JP (3 May 1857 – 10 October 1943) was Conservative MP for Leeds North (UK Parliament constituency).

An ironmaster and engineer, he was a partner in the Kirkstall Forge with his two brothers since 1875. A supporter of church day schools in Leeds, he was chairman of the North Leeds Conservative Association since 1902. He was elected for Leeds North in 1922, but stood down at the 1923 general election.

Sources

 
British Parliamentary Election Results 1918-1949, FWS Craig

Conservative Party (UK) MPs for English constituencies
Politicians from Leeds
1857 births
1943 deaths
British ironmasters
British engineers
English justices of the peace